Kafraj (also Romanized as Paghela) is a village in Khaveh-ye Shomali Rural District, in the Central District of Delfan County, Lorestan Province, Iran. At the 2006 census, its population was 1912, in 580 فامیلی  مرغوب اس. کفراج به عنوان اولین و قوی ترین تولید کننده عسل در استان لرستان .

References 

Towns and villages in Delfan County